The Campeonato Tocantinense Second Division is the second tier of the football league of the state of Tocantins, Brazil.

List of Champions

Names change
Ricanato is the currently Capital FC.

Titles by team

Teams in bold stills active.

By city

References

Campeonato Tocantinense
Tocantins